Mynes websteri  is a medium-sized butterfly of the family Nymphalidae endemic to New Guinea.

References

 

Nymphalini
Butterflies described in 1894
Endemic fauna of New Guinea